Erythrolamprus cobella, commonly known as the mangrove snake, is a species of small semi-aquatic snake, which is endemic to South America.

Geographic range
It is found in northern South America east of the Andes, in the Guianas, eastern Venezuela, and Trinidad and Tobago.

Description

Dorsally, it is black or dark brown with white crossbands. Ventrally it is red with black crossbands. The upper labials are white or yellowish.

There  are 8 upper labials, the 4th and 5th entering the eye. The dorsal scales, which are smooth and without apical pits, are arranged in 17 rows at midbody.  Ventrals 143–163; anal plate divided; subcaudals 45–57, also divided (in two rows).

Habitat
It lives in lowland rainforest river floodplains and coastal mangrove swamps.

Diet
It feeds on frogs, geckos, and fish.

References

Further reading
Linnaeus, C. 1758. Systema naturae per regna tria naturæ, secundum classes, ordines, genera, species, cum characteribus, differentiis, synonymis, locis. Tomus I. Editio Decima, Reformata. L. Salvius. Stockholm. 824 pp. (Coluber cobella, p. 218.)

Erythrolamprus
Reptiles of Trinidad and Tobago
Vertebrates of Guyana
Reptiles of Venezuela
Reptiles described in 1758
Taxa named by Carl Linnaeus